VisitEngland is the official tourist board for England.

Before 1999 it was known as the English Tourist Board and between 1999 and 2009 as the English Tourism Council. In 2003, it merged with the British Tourist Authority to form VisitBritain before relaunching as a separate corporate body in 2009. VisitEngland's stated mission is to "build England's tourism product, raise Britain’s profile worldwide, increase the volume and value of tourism exports and develop England and Britain’s visitor economy".

Quality assessment schemes
The VisitEngland accommodation assessment schemes were run under licence by Quality in Tourism from 2012 to 2017, when the AA took on the license.

The scheme issues quality awards to holiday accommodation, hotel, bed and breakfast, self catering holiday cottages and others.

See also
 Tourism in England
 VisitBritain
 Northern Ireland Tourist Board
 VisitScotland
 Visit Wales

References

External links
 Official website for holidays and short breaks in England

2003 establishments in England
2009 disestablishments in England
Organisations based in England
Tourism in England
Department for Digital, Culture, Media and Sport
Non-departmental public bodies of the United Kingdom government
Organizations disestablished in 2003
Governance of England
Tourism organisations in the United Kingdom
Tourism agencies